Jules Blankfein (died June 2, 1989) was a physician and financier; co-founder of Physicians Hospital in Jackson Heights, Queens (New York City). He was a 1921 graduate of Yale University, and received a medical degree from New York Medical College and Flower-Fifth Avenue Hospital in 1928. Blankein was one of the nine physicians who founded Physicians Hospital (NYC) in 1935; he served as its president and as a director.  He also served as a trustee of New York Medical College.

The New York Times said "He was a trustee of New York Medical College and contributed generously to many Jewish causes."

Personal
Jules Blankfein and his family remained involved with Yale from the time of his graduation in 1921.  He and his wife Frieda were the parents of two sons, Robert Blankfein, M.D. and Richard Blankfein, and grandparents to Roger and Eric. Lloyd Blankfein's father Seymour was a brother to Jules.  Robert graduated from The Hotchkiss School and Yale College, he is a member of the Yale College Class of 1954 Council, his son, David, is a graduate of the Yale Law School.

References

American company founders
Yale School of Engineering & Applied Science alumni
Yale University alumni
Yale College alumni